The 1995 United States Formula Ford 2000 National Championship was the first USF2000 national championship sanctioned by the SCCA Pro Racing. The championship was formed after the merger of the USAC FF2000 series and the American Continental Championship. Jeret Schroeder, racing with Schroeder Racing, won the championship.

Race calendar and results

Drivers' Championship

References